The Little River is a  tributary of the Withlacoochee River in the U.S. state of Georgia.  Via the Withlacoochee and the Suwannee River its waters flow to the Gulf of Mexico. The Little River was also known historically as the Ockolocoochee River.

The river flows southeast into Tift County, passing west of Tifton, then turns more southerly as it becomes the boundary between Colquitt and Cook counties. The river subsequently becomes the boundary between Cook and Brooks counties, then between Brooks and Lowndes counties.

Recreation

Reed Bingham State Park is a recreational area along the Little River. It includes a 375-acre (1.52 km2) lake created by a dam built in 1965 across the river.

Tributaries 
Some named tributaries to the Little River include:

 Warrior Creek (named after Warrior John, a Cherokee warrior)
 Town Creek
 Hog Heaven Branch
 Briar Branch
 Horse Creek
 Lolly Creek
 Ty Ty Creek

Crossings

See also
List of rivers of Georgia

References 

USGS Hydrologic Unit Map - State of Georgia (1974)

Rivers of Georgia (U.S. state)
Rivers of Brooks County, Georgia
Rivers of Colquitt County, Georgia
Rivers of Cook County, Georgia
Rivers of Lowndes County, Georgia
Rivers of Tift County, Georgia
Rivers of Turner County, Georgia